The Clover 2030 Engineering Strategy, also known as project Ingeniería 2030, is a joint initiative between two Chilean universities, the Pontifical Catholic University of Chile and the Federico Santa María Technical University This joint project was started in 2013, in order to transform engineering education by developing a new, shorter curricular design, funding relevant research, and by establishing a student-centered education that emphasizes multidisciplinarity, user-centered design and social responsibility as well as student flexibility and choice. This initiative thus expects to provide a platform to work on societal grand challenges, to orchestrate effective I+E networks, and to build a world-class engineering community.

This consortium expects to transform these universities into world-class institutions, positioning them as the best engineering schools in Latinamerica by 2020 and among the best 50 engineering schools in the world by 2030.

Background
In 2013, the Chilean National Agency for Innovation and Development (CORFO) launched the "New Engineering 2030" initiative, as a bid to transform the economy. In sync with international trends in engineering education, CORFO decided to motivate the renewal of engineering training so as to be more prepared to address significant challenges of the society. The New Engineering 2030 set out to co-finance strategic plans that would serve as a 6-year roadmap to create engineering education that meets global requirements by means of applied research, technology transfer, innovation and technology-based entrepreneurship. By motivating universities to prepare more engineers towards international competitiveness and productivity, CORFO intended to propel Chile from a developing to a developed knowledge-based economy.

In 2014, the joint proposal by School of Engineering at the Universidad Catóica, in alliance with the Universidad Técnica Federico Santa María, obtained the highest ranking in this national competition of 8 projects presented by different university consortia in the country.

Characteristics 
Some of the characteristics of this initiative are:

References

College and university associations and consortia in South America
Educational organisations based in Chile
2013 establishments in Chile
Educational institutions established in 2013